Fatma Kurtulan (* 1 March 1964, Kahramanmaras, Turkey) is a Turkish Kurd politician of the Peoples' Democratic Party (HDP) in Turkey.

After graduating from Pazarcık high school, Kurtulan worked on social projects in the Küçükdikili municipality in Adana. A former president of the women's branch of People's Democracy Party (HADEP), in July 2007, Kurtulan stood as an independent candidate in the Turkish parliamentary elections and entered the Turkish Parliament (Grand National Assembly of Turkey). She then joined the Democratic Society Party (DTP).

On 9 November 2007 the Turkish chief public prosecutor launched an investigation into her activities, after she visited Iraq with two other DTP politicians to obtain the release of eight Turkish soldiers held by Kurdistan Workers' Party (PKK) forces. The prosecutor requested that the Turkish Parliament remove the parliamentary immunity of all three MPs.

In the same month she admitted being married to a PKK member, adding that her husband, Samlan Kurtulan, who the media reported to be in a PKK guerilla camp in northern Iraq, had been away for 13 years and that she remained married only on paper.

In May 2009 she called for an investigation into police violence against children.

In January 2012 she was arrested in connection with the KCK trials and subsequently sentenced to 10 Months in prison in April 2012 She was a candidate for the HDP in the Parliamentary Election 2018 and was elected MP for Mersin.

External links 
Official website of the HDP

References

1964 births
Turkish Kurdish politicians
Living people
Deputies of Van
Democratic Regions Party politicians
Democratic Society Party politicians
Members of the 23rd Parliament of Turkey
21st-century Turkish women politicians
Members of the 27th Parliament of Turkey
People's Democracy Party politicians
People from Kahramanmaraş